Egrets are herons, generally long-legged wading birds, that have white or buff plumage, developing fine plumes (usually milky white) during the breeding season. Egrets are not a biologically distinct group from herons and have the same build.

Biology

Many egrets are members of the genera Egretta or Ardea, which also contain other species named as herons rather than egrets. The distinction between a heron and an egret is rather vague, and depends more on appearance than biology. The word "egret" comes from the French word aigrette that means both "silver heron" and "brush", referring to the long, filamentous feathers that seem to cascade down an egret's back during the breeding season (also called "egrets").

Several of the egrets have been reclassified from one genus to another in recent years; the great egret, for example, has been classified as a member of either Casmerodius, Egretta, or Ardea.

In the 19th and early part of the 20th centuries, some of the world's egret species were endangered by relentless plume hunting, since hat makers in Europe and the United States demanded large numbers of egret plumes, leading to breeding birds being killed in many places around the world.

Several Egretta species, including the eastern reef egret, the reddish egret, and the western reef egret, have two distinct colours, one of which is just white. The little blue heron has all-white juvenile plumage.

Species in taxonomic order

 Great egret or great white egret, Ardea alba
 Great blue heron, Ardea herodias
 Intermediate egret, Mesophoyx intermedia
 Cattle egret, Bubulcus ibis
 Little egret Egretta garzetta
 Snowy egret, Egretta thula
 Reddish egret, Egretta rufescens
 Slaty egret, Egretta vinaceigula
 Black egret, Egretta ardesiaca
 Chinese egret, Egretta eulophotes
 Eastern reef egret or Pacific reef heron, Egretta sacra
 Western reef egret or Western reef heron, Egretta gularis

Habitat

Egrets inhabit all continents; although they typically avoid the coldest regions, arid deserts, and very high mountains. They hunt and live in both saltwater and freshwater marshes.

References

External links
 
 Well written and illustrated Egret article Encyclopaedia Britannica
 Great egret Ardea alba—USGS+24r5

Bird common names